London Pride is a 1941 novel by the British writer Phyllis Bottome. It takes place in wartime London  and follows an East End family during the height of The Blitz during the summer of 1940. It is seen through the eyes of a seven year old boy Ben, named after Big Ben, whose mother is a charwoman and his father is a docker. During the novel his neighbours are killed in an air raid and his own house bombed before he is eventually evacuated to the countryside at the conclusion.

References

Bibliography
 Calder, Robert L. Beware the British Serpent: The Role of Writers in British Propaganda in the United States, 1939-1945. McGill-Queen's Press, 2004.
 Welsh, Dave. Underground Writing: The London Tube from George Gissing to Virginia Woolf. Liverpool University Press, 2010.

1941 British novels
Novels by Phyllis Bottome
Novels set in London
Novels set during World War II
Faber and Faber books